日本鬼子 may refer to:
Riben guizi, a Chinese pejorative for Japanese people
Hinomoto Oniko, a Japanese moe character based on the slur
Japanese Devils, a Japanese documentary about war crimes committed by the Imperial Japanese Army